Bernard "Peck" Hickman (October 5, 1911 – February 20, 2000) was an American basketball player and coach. As head coach he led the Louisville Cardinals to the 1948 NAIB Championship (today's NAIA), the 1956 NIT Championship and the school's first NCAA final Four in 1959. He never had a losing season in 23 years as head coach, finishing with a 443–183 overall record, a .708 winning percentage that ranks him among the top 45 NCAA Division I coaches of all time.

Early life and playing career
Hickman was born on October 5, 1911, in Central City, Kentucky.

High school

He attended Central City High School where he played basketball for head coach George Taylor. Central City went 116–20 during Hickman's four years (1928–31) in high school. They won four region championships and went to four State Tournaments where he made the All-State Tournament team in 1929 and 1931. He was also an all-state basketball player two seasons in 1930–31.

College

He lettered three seasons at guard at Western Kentucky for head coach Ed Diddle. WKU went 83–25 during Hickman's four years in college. They won four KIAC Tournament Championships and one SIAA Tournament Championship. He made the Kentucky All-State team in 1933 and 1934, the ALL-KIAC Tournament team in 1935, and the ALL-SIAA Tournament team in 1934 and 1935. He graduated from WKU in 1935 with a bachelor's degree in physical education. He completed his master's degree in physical education at the University of Kentucky College of Education in 1944.

Coaching career

High school

Hickman coached Hodgenville (KY) High School and Valley High School to a combined 216–49 record. He led  Valley to the Kentucky Sweet 16 twice.

University of Louisville
Hickman was hired as head coach and athletic director at Louisville in 1944. 

He guided his first team to a 16–4 record. Prior to his arrival the program only had 11 winning seasons in 33 years of play. The Cardinals never had a losing season in Hickman's 23 seasons as head coach.

Hickman led Louisville to their first championship on a national level by winning the NAIB Championship in 1948.  

In 1956, his team headed by All American Charlie Tyra won the NIT Championship. 
In 1956 his team was placed on two years probation, to include bans on postseason play, by the NCAA due to recruiting violations. 
In 1959, he led the Cardinals to their first NCAA Tournament Final Four.

From 1954 to 1967, Hickman doubled as head coach and athletic director, a position he would hold full-time until his retirement in 1973. One of Hickman's last acts as athletic director was to hire UCLA assistant coach Denny Crum, who would lead the program to two NCAA titles and six final fours en route to the College Basketball hall of fame.

In 24 years as basketball head coach for the Cardinals, Hickman compiled a record of 443–183 (.708). 82 percent of his players graduated, and was the second basketball coach in Kentucky to break the color barrier in 1962 by recruiting Eddie Whitehead, and Wade Houston.

Awards and honors
Hickman was inducted into the Helms Athletic Foundation Hall of Fame in 1967 and to the National Association of Collegiate Directors of Athletics Hall in 1981.

Head coaching record

See also
 List of NCAA Division I Men's Final Four appearances by coach

References

1911 births
2000 deaths
American men's basketball coaches
Louisville Cardinals athletic directors
Louisville Cardinals men's basketball coaches
Western Kentucky Hilltoppers basketball players
People from Central City, Kentucky
Basketball players from Louisville, Kentucky
Sportspeople from Louisville, Kentucky
American men's basketball players
Basketball coaches from Kentucky
Guards (basketball)